Trichostigma peruvianum is a species of flowering plant in the family Petiveriaceae. It was formerly placed in the family Phytolaccaceae. It is native to Ecuador, Colombia, and Peru.

References 

 University of Connecticut entry
 UniProt entry
 Werner Greuter, "Proposal to Conserve the Name Trichostigma against Villamillia (Phytolaccaceae)", Taxon, Vol. 50, No. 3, Golden Jubilee Part 5 (Aug., 2001), pp. 933–935.

Petiveriaceae
Plants described in 1849